My Friend the Devil is a lost 1922 silent film romantic drama directed by Harry Millarde. It starred stage actor Charles Richman and was produced and distributed by Fox Film.

Cast
Charles Richman as George Dryden
Ben Grauer as George Dryden, as a boy
William H. Tooker as Dr. Brewster
Adolph Milar as Dryden's Stepfather
John Tavernier as The Old Doctor
Myrtle Stewart as George Dryden's Mother
Barbara Castleton as Anna Ryder
Alice May as Mrs. Ryder
Peggy Shaw as Beatrice Dryden
Robert Frazer as The Artist
Mabel Wright as The Governess

See also
1937 Fox vault fire

References

External links

 My Friend the Devil at IMDb.com

1922 films
American silent feature films
Lost American films
Fox Film films
Films based on French novels
Films based on works by Georges Ohnet
Films directed by Harry F. Millarde
American black-and-white films
American romantic drama films
1922 romantic drama films
1920s American films
Silent romantic drama films
Silent American drama films